Tatsiana Sheuchyk (born 11 June 1969) is a retired Belarusian high jumper. She competed at the 1992 Barcelona Olympics. Her other international results include finishing fourth at the 1994 European Indoor Championships, sixth at the 1995 IAAF World Indoor Championships and fifth at the 1995 World Championships.

Her personal best jump is 2.00 metres, achieved in May 1993 in Gomel.

International competitions

References

1969 births
Living people
Soviet female high jumpers
Belarusian female high jumpers
Athletes (track and field) at the 1992 Summer Olympics
Athletes (track and field) at the 2000 Summer Olympics
Olympic athletes of Belarus
Olympic athletes of the Unified Team